Pissodini is a tribe of weevils described by Johannes von Nepomuk Franz Xaver Gistel in 1856.

Pissodini includes the genus Pissodes.

References 

http://species.wikimedia.org/wiki/Pissodini

Molytinae
Polyphaga tribes
Insect vectors of plant pathogens
Taxa named by Johannes von Nepomuk Franz Xaver Gistel